Chile sent a delegation to compete at the 2010 Winter Paralympics, in Vancouver. It fielded a total of two athletes, both in alpine skiing.

Alpine skiing 

The following two athletes represented Chile in alpine skiing:

See also

Chile at the 2010 Winter Olympics
Chile at the Paralympics

References

External links
Vancouver 2010 Paralympic Games official website
International Paralympic Committee official website

Nations at the 2010 Winter Paralympics
2010
Paralympics